Cain and Abel (often abbreviated to Cain) was a password recovery tool for Microsoft Windows. It could recover many kinds of passwords using methods such as network packet sniffing, cracking various password hashes by using methods such as dictionary attacks, brute force and cryptanalysis attacks.
Cryptanalysis attacks were done via rainbow tables which could be generated with the winrtgen.exe program provided with Cain and Abel.
Cain and Abel was maintained by Massimiliano Montoro and Sean Babcock.

Features 
 WEP cracking
 Speeding up packet capture speed by wireless packet injection
 Ability to record VoIP conversations
 Decoding scrambled passwords
 Calculating hashes
 Traceroute
 Revealing password boxes
 Uncovering cached passwords
 Dumping protected storage passwords
 ARP spoofing
 IP to MAC Address resolver
 Network Password Sniffer
 LSA secret dumper
 Ability to crack:
 LM & NTLM hashes
 NTLMv2 hashes
 Microsoft Cache hashes
 Microsoft Windows PWL files
 Cisco IOS – MD5  hashes
 Cisco PIX – MD5 hashes
 APOP – MD5 hashes
 CRAM-MD5 MD5 hashes
 OSPF – MD5 hashes
 RIPv2 MD5 hashes
 VRRP – HMAC hashes
 Virtual Network Computing (VNC) Triple DES
 MD2 hashes
 MD4 hashes
 MD5 hashes
 SHA-1 hashes
 SHA-2 hashes
 RIPEMD-160 hashes
 Kerberos 5 hashes
 RADIUS shared key hashes
 IKE PSK hashes
 MSSQL hashes
 MySQL hashes
 Oracle and SIP hashes

Status with virus scanners 
Some virus scanners (and browsers, e.g. Google Chrome 20.0.1132.47) detect Cain and Abel as malware.

Avast! detects it as "Win32:Cain-B [Tool]" and classifies it as "Other potentially dangerous program", while Microsoft Security Essentials detects it as "Win32/Cain!4_9_14" and classifies it as "Tool: This program has potentially unwanted behavior."
Even if Cain's install directory, as well as the word "Cain", are added to Avast's exclude list, the real-time scanner has been known to stop Cain from functioning. However, the latest version of Avast no longer blocks Cain.

Symantec (the developer of the Norton family of computer security software) identified a buffer overflow vulnerability in version 4.9.24 that allowed for remote code execution in the event the application was used to open a large RDP file, as might occur when using the program to analyze network traffic. The vulnerability had been present in the previous version (4.9.23) as well and was patched in a subsequent release.

See also 
 Black-hat hacker
 White-hat hacker
 Hacker (computer security)
 Password cracking
 Aircrack-ng
 Crack
 DaveGrohl
 Hashcat
 John the Ripper
 L0phtCrack
 Ophcrack
 RainbowCrack

References

External links 
 
 

Windows-only freeware
Password cracking software
Windows security software
Network analyzers
Windows network-related software